Allan Ekman (2 December 1891 – 25 February 1950) was a Swedish equestrian. He competed in the individual jumping event at the 1920 Summer Olympics.

References

1891 births
1950 deaths
Swedish male equestrians
Olympic equestrians of Sweden
Equestrians at the 1920 Summer Olympics
Sportspeople from Malmö